Dark Congress is an original novel based on the American television series Buffy the Vampire Slayer, and is written by Christopher Golden.

Plot summary
Golden has revealed some things about the plotline in an interview with Slayerlit:
 
"Once upon a time, all of the demonic and monstrous races, and the old gods, would choose ambassadors to send to the Dark Congress, which would take place under a general truce once every hundred years. The world is populated by demons from dark dimensions and many other supernatural beings and breeds, and they all have different attitudes toward humanity and the world. Some want to leave to return to their home dimensions, some to conquer this one; some want to live in peace with human beings, and others want to eat them."

The story takes place after the seventh season of Buffy. The Congress has not met for 500 years, having failed to come to an agreement.

The story starts as Micaela, a Watcher, unknowingly releases the demon, Kandida, one of the leaders of the Dark Congress.

Then, we find Buffy, and Xander in Providence, Rhode Island, trekking to the location of the city's own Hellmouth. There, they meet Trabajo the Sand demon, from whom they nearly escape.

Meanwhile, in Greece, Willow is living happily with Kennedy, until she returns to their apartment to find Kennedy has cheated on her with a newbie Slayer. Completely broken-hearted, Willow immediately leaves and heads to Athens to clear her mind, there she meets a very ancient witch named Catherine, who promises Willow her heart's desire if she will be her apprentice. She gives Willow a very powerful scroll and her witch's familiar, a ginger cat.  With a very ancient spell Willow is able to resurrect her former lover Tara Maclay, with whom the familiar shares a body. Willow and Tara have an emotional reunion.

Elsewhere, former Scooby, Oz, is approached by an elder werewolf, who tells him that he is needed in Providence.

Faith, who is now in San Francisco, finishes off vamps in the city, gets a message from a vamp who is a minion of an ancient vampiress named Harmann and decides to head back to New England, to Rhode Island, to meet up with Buffy. She arrives there and is attacked by The Gentlemen (of the Buffy Season 4 episode, "Hush"). She defeats them and remeets Xander, and has a sisterly reunion with "B".

Giles, in England, has heard of all of the supernatural activity centered on Providence and he and Micaela travel to Rhode Island. Willow decides to bring Tara to meet Buffy and Xander, and Oz also heeds the older wolf's orders and goes to Providence. The Scoobies have a very happy reunion, especially with the resurrection of Tara (of which both Buffy and Giles are highly skeptical).

They learn of the Dark Congress which is in session above the once active hellmouth in Providence, and the court of Demons want Buffy to be their arbiter. The Sand demon Trabajo is reunited with his lover, Kandida, but the two have a short reunion when Kandida's heart is ripped out. Trabajo is about to accuse a few of the members of the Congress and attack them, which would send the Congress in chaos and start an inevitable apocalypse. Buffy must keep that from happening by finding Kandida's killers and bringing them before the Council before Trabajo has a chance at them.

The suspects are; Haarmann, the ancient vampiress; Willow's new suspicious and very intimidating teacher, Catherine; and Malik a rogue "Champion" for The Powers that Be, and his group of warriors who will kill anything connected to demons, including demons who aren't harmful, and even Slayers.

Buffy is horrified and disgusted to be included. After all she is not a demon...is she? She knows so little about her powers that she can't say for certain where they truly spring from. How can she spend so much time wallowing in the darkness without becoming part of it? Can she possibly agree to a truce with all the horrors of the world, and allow them to come to Providence without any attempt to stop them? Does she have a choice?

Meanwhile, can Willow and Tara come to terms with their denial that Tara's resurrection is anything but unnatural?

Continuity

Characters
Confirmed characters include Buffy, Xander, Willow, Faith, Oz, Giles, and a resurrected Tara.
New characters include, watcher Micaela, Trabajo, Kandida, and Malik & his group of Champions.

Timing
Intended to be set after BtVS's seventh season. Golden has commented, "Set a couple of months after season seven's wrap-up."

Canonical Issues

Buffy novels such as this one are not usually considered canon by the fans. Some consider them stories from the imaginations of authors and artists, while others think of them as taking place in an alternate reality. However, these novels are not mere fan fiction, as overviews which summarize their plots are approved early on by both FOX and Joss Whedon (or at least his office). The books are then published as official Buffy/Angel merchandise.

Joss Whedon's canonical Buffy the Vampire Slayer season eight comics series may leave the novel out of canonical continuity. Golden has said "with Joss bringing the comics back with his own season eight, all I could do was try to go by the few glimpses we've had of that storyline. But the novels have always had their own continuity which is not the same as, but is parallel to and as similar as possible to the official continuity." When asked about Season Eight's influence, he stated "I knew almost nothing about the comics before the manuscript was out of my hands. I'd seen only a few sample pages of Season 8, and tried to do what I could to keep it in line with what I learned from those few pages."
Golden has said that Dark Congress is not canonical with the other post-S7 Buffy novel, Nancy Holder's Queen of the Slayers.
The only allusion to the official Season 8 Comics, is Buffy stating that Dawn is taking care of their Headquarters in Scotland. Scotland is the setting where Buffy, Xander, Dawn and their squad of Slayers live in Season 8.

Footnotes and references

External links
 
Mata, Shiai, "CHRISTOPHER GOLDEN INTERVIEW 2", SlayerLit.us (2007).
"Christopher Golden returns to Buffy" Whedonesque.com (December 16, 2006).

2007 American novels
2007 fantasy novels
Books based on Buffy the Vampire Slayer
Novels set in Providence, Rhode Island